A Place Among the Living is a 2003 French film directed by Chilean filmmaker Raúl Ruiz.

Cast
 Christian Vadim - Ernest Ripper                          
 Thierry Gibault - Joseph Archimboldo          
 Valérie Kaprisky - Maryse
 Denis Karvil - Le premier amateur              
 Cécile Bois - Sabine
 Julie Judd - Sandrine
 Monalisa Basarab - The Blonde

References

External links
 

2003 films
French drama films
Films directed by Raúl Ruiz
2000s French films